Andrei Leonidovich Stas (born 18 October 1988) is a Belarusian professional ice hockey forward who is currently playing for Traktor Chelyabinsk in the Kontinental Hockey League (KHL).

Playing career
He began playing with Yunost Minsk in 2003 and later joined Keramin Minsk of the Belarusian Extraliga. During the 2008–09 season he made his debut with HC Dinamo Minsk. On 8 June 2014, Stas joined Russian club, CSKA Moscow on a three-year contract.

After helping Avangard Omsk to their maiden Gagarin Cup championship in the 2020–21 season, Stas left as a free agent to sign an optional three-year contract with Traktor Chelyabinsk on 5 May 2021.

International play
Stas was selected for the Belarus national men's ice hockey team in the 2010 Winter Olympics. He previously represented Belarus at the 2005 and 2006 IIHF World U18 Championships, the 2007 and 2008 World Junior Championship, and the 2009 Ice Hockey World Championships.

Awards and honors

Career statistics

Regular season and playoffs

International

References

External links

 

1988 births
Avangard Omsk players
Belarusian ice hockey centres
HC CSKA Moscow players
HC Dinamo Minsk players
HC Neftekhimik Nizhnekamsk players
HC Shakhtyor Soligorsk players
Ice hockey players at the 2010 Winter Olympics
Living people
Olympic ice hockey players of Belarus
Ice hockey people from Minsk
Traktor Chelyabinsk players
Belarusian expatriate sportspeople in Russia
Belarusian expatriate ice hockey people
Expatriate ice hockey players in Russia